Louis Blouwe (born 19 November 1999) is a Belgian cyclist, who currently rides for UCI ProTeam .

His uncle Johan Bruyneel was also a professional cyclist.

Major results
2021
 1st Grote Prijs Stad Sint-Niklaas
 L'Étoile d'Or
1st Mountains classification
1st Points classification
 9th Overall Tour de la Mirabelle
2023
 7th Nokere Koerse

References

External links

1999 births
Living people
Belgian male cyclists
People from Izegem
Cyclists from West Flanders
21st-century Belgian people